Bhagabhadra (Brāhmī: 𑀪𑀸𑀕𑀪𑀤𑁆𑀭) was one of the kings of the Indian Shunga dynasty. He ruled in north, central India around from 114 BCE to 83 BCE. Although the capital of the Shungas was at Pataliputra, he was also known to have held court at Vidisha. It is thought that the name Bhagabhadra also appears in the regnal lists of the Shungas in the Puranic records, under the name Bhadraka, fifth ruler of the Shungas.

Heliodorus inscription
He is best known from an inscription at the site of Vidisha in central India, the Heliodorus pillar, in which contacts with an embassy from the Indo-Greek king Antialcidas is recorded, and where he is named "Kasiputra Bhagabhadra, the Saviour, son of the princess from Benares":

Translation:

(Archaeological Survey of India, Annual Report (1908-1909))

This inscription is important in that it tends to validate that the Shungas ruled in the area of Vidisa around 100 BCE. This is also corroborated by some artistic realization on the nearby Sanchi stupa thought to belong to the period of the Shungas. Altogether, three Shunga pillars have also been found in the area .The Garuda pillar erected by Heliodorous and the inscription written on this pillar is regarded as the earliest material evidence of Bhagavatism in India.

References

External links
Photo of the pillar with Brahmi inscription
Heliodorus pillar at Vidisha
Text of the inscriptions on Heliodorus pillar
Vedic archeology

2nd-century BC Indian monarchs